Limeade is a lime-flavored drink sweetened with sugar. A typical method of preparation is to juice limes, and combine the juice with simple syrup or honey syrup, along with some additional water and perhaps more sugar or honey. Vodka or white tequila can be added to make a limeade cocktail.

Most major beverage companies now offer their own brand of limeade, such as A.G. Barr of Glasgow and Newman's Own since 2004, with Minute Maid introducing a cherry limeade drink in response to the popularity of limeade.

Sonic Drive-In uses Sprite to create its popular cherry limeade.

Limeade is popular in tropical countries such as Jamaica where limes are common.

It is one of the most popular drinks in India and Pakistan and is known as nimbu paani or limbu pani; lemons can also be used for nimbu paani.

Limeade is also widely available in Thailand and other parts of Southeast Asia due to the abundance of limes and relative rarity of lemons, as lemons are not a native species. A Thai-styled limeade tastes salty, and sometimes does not have any sugar.

See also 
 Lemonade
 Lemon-lime drink
 List of juices
 List of lemonade topics
 List of soft drink flavors

References

External links 
 Mint Limeade recipe
 All Recipes' Limeade recipe

 
Cold drinks
Limes (fruit)
Citrus drinks